Colonia is a department of southwestern Uruguay. Its capital is Colonia del Sacramento, the country's second oldest city.

Geography

Climate
Colonia has an annual average temperature of 20.4 °C (68.7 °F). In winter it has an average temperature of 9 °C (48.2 °F) and in summer it has an average temperature of 27 °C (80.6 °F)

Economy
The southwestern region of Uruguay, in which Colonia is located, is typically associated with dairy production. Its proximity to Buenos Aires makes it the main entry point for tourists traveling from Argentina to Uruguay. Tourism is also favored by the presence of a World Heritage Site. The PepsiCo plant located in the department's capital, is one of the three largest worldwide, employing more than 2,000 people and serving the entire Latin American import market. The plant operates under special economic zone legislation, and as of November 2019, has successfully approved an enlargement investment for $65 million.

Demographics

As of the census of 2011, Colonia Department has a population of 123,204 (60,203 male and 63,001 female) and 57,003 households.

Rural population
According to the 2011 census, Colonia department has an additional rural population of 11,471.

See also
 List of populated places in Uruguay#Colonia Department
 Fomento, Uruguay

References

External links

INE map of Colonia Department
Nuestra Terra, Colección Los Departamentos, Vol.14 "Colonia"

 
Departments of Uruguay
States and territories established in 1816
1816 establishments in Uruguay